Google Friend Connect was a free social networking site from 2008 to 2012. Similar to Facebook Platform and MySpaceID, it took a decentralized approach, allowing users to build a profile to share and update information (through messaging, photographs and video content) via third-party sites. These sites acted as a host for profile sharing and social exchanges.

Google Friend Connect used open standards such as OpenID, OAuth and OpenSocial with the intent of freeing users from having to register for additional accounts or usernames. Once authenticated they could use their existing profile and access a social graph when posting messages.

It has been said that "social network APIs (how different services on the web talk to each other) such as the MySpace API, Facebook Connect and Google Friend Connect take the online social graph beyond social networking sites to external web sites and applications". This social graph feature allowed a user to post a message on a third-party site, but allowed viewing access only to other authorised "friends" contained within the user's chosen social graph.

Friend Connect was removed for all non-Blogger sites by March 1, 2012, and for Blogger sites on January 11, 2016.

APIs
The Google Friend Connect APIs provided these features to website owners:
Customising the appearance of Google Friend Connect to match their websites' styles and designs.
Advertising and website content tailored to individual user profiles.
Querying the content of user profiles.

Third-party sites were connected via social-networking sites to contact users when they use the site. By acknowledging user profiles they can attempt to offer content of interest, based on the user's available profile. The third-party sites that interact with social connect services do this by adding HTML/JavaScript gadgets into their pages, allowing them to immediately change or add relevant content (through altering the HTML code). Google Friend Connect requires the approval of the website using it. It requires no knowledge of web programming and enables any website to offer social applications and content from Hi5, Orkut, Plaxo, MySpace, Google Talk, Netlog and other social networks.

Twitter, YouTube and 30 other social media benchmarking sites have been added to Google Friend Connect since it began in 2008.

Multiple social gadgets are used to enable Friend Connect interaction. These include Social Bar, Comments, Ratings and Reviews, Featured Content, Interests' Poll, Recommendations, Events and Games. In June 2009 Google added ClackPoint as a gadget. ClackPoint mixes live text chat, conference calling and document sharing. Status icons in the gadget mean that users can see who is dialing in and who is talking, and can poke or mute themselves or each other and a shared notepad allows multiple users to edit instantaneously.

The Google Friend Connect community widget can be put into the sidebar or footer to promote an organization or sites content. Similarly functioning widgets are BlogCatalog and Facebook Fan Pages.

Statistics
Approximately 200,000 websites are said to use Google Friend Connect, and 2889 of them are in the top million visited sites on the Internet. Google, however, estimates it has over 5 million sites using Friend Connect.

99% of sites were said to not be socially enabled prior to the introduction of Friend Connect services.

History
Google Friend Connect was first previewed at a Google developer event in May 2008 and launched within days of Facebook Platform.

At the launch Google called Friend Connect a "set of functions and applications enabling website owners to easily make their sites social by adding registration, invitations, member's gallery, message posting and reviews, plus applications built by the open social developer community".

In December 2008 Google Friend Connect became available to any webmaster wanting to adopt social applications.

Independent musician Ingrid Michaelson's official website was one of the first websites used as a prototype by Google to illustrate features from Google Friend Connect. A site by Google on Guacamole was another early sample site.

David Glazer, the Director of Engineering at Google, called Google Friend Connect "plumbing for the rest of the Web".

On November 23, 2011, Google's Senior Vice President of Operations Urs Hölzle announced that Friend Connect would be retired for all non-Blogger sites by March 1, 2012, and encouraged Google+'s pages and off-site Page badges as the preferred alternative.  On December 21, 2015, Michael Goddard announced that the service would be turned off on Blogger on January 11, 2016, stating that "we’ve seen that most people sign into Friend Connect with a Google Account."

User data
There are three types of information that make up user data in Google Friend Connect.
Identity data – offers a description of identity and ‘my profile'.
Social-graph data – contains friendship connections i.e. family member, colleague.
Content data – Includes saved data objects, such as ‘my messages', ‘my photos' etc.

Privacy
Responsibility is left to individual websites to make the decision to allow the Google Friend Connect service or not.

To access Google Friend Connect, sign in is by Google Account or other services that support OpenID such as Yahoo and ChromeOS Instant Messenger.

Google states it has five privacy principles. These principles set out their guidelines for governing privacy. They state that;

They use information with the intent to provide users with valuable products and services.
They develop products that aim to maintain strong privacy standards and practices.
Their aim is to make any collected information transparent.
They offer user choice for overseeing privacy protection.
They act as a responsible "steward" of the information held.

Information received by Google when Google Friend Connect is accessed
A user's Friend Connect activity on the site, including when they login and interact with the site's gadgets, which of their friends they have invited to join the site, which of their friends have accepted their invitations and who their friends are on the Friend Connect site. This information is said to be necessary to provide the user with the Friend Connect service and to properly display any content (only to those people the user has chosen to share it with).
If one chooses to invite friends from their current social networking sites, Google will request a list of their friends from that site to send the invitations. Depending on the site, Google may also receive limited information about those friends, such as nicknames and photos. Google will not retain this information for more than 24 hours.
For users who link in their Twitter account, Google also receives and stores their username and password; They use this information only to provide the user with the service and will delete it if they choose to disconnect their Twitter account from their Friend Connect account.
If the site uses gadgets developed by Google then the information collected by those gadgets will be governed by the Google Privacy Policy.

However, a breach was reported in November 2010, where an exploit allowed users to harvest email addresses for logged in users when a visitor used a website. This was an example of not just a security breach, but of privacy for its users.

Information requests
Personal information is required to create a Google Account (email and password to protect unauthorized access). If an OpenID account is used instead, Google does not receive information from an identity provider. User activity on Google Friend Connect sites is stored in association with the user's Google Account or OpenID account.

What social networks see
Users determine whether they want to publish their activities on a particular Friend Connect site to their activity streams in their social network (by default, this is set to off). If they choose to publish them, their activities (posts, reviews, etc.) will be sent to their social networks and anyone with access to their activity stream will be able to see these updates. In addition, if they use Friend Connect to invite friends from their existing social networks, those social networks will receive information needed to pass along this invitation to their friends.

What site owners see
Google Friend Connect never provides site owners with users' private sign-in information. Google Friend Connect and the service one uses to sign in - not the site owner's - validate their sign-in credentials. Once one has joined a Friend Connect site, the site owner can then see the user's nickname and the date they became a member. The site owner will also be able to see one's image and the content they choose to publish on the site, such as a wall comment or a review. Site owners also have the ability to remove members from and moderate content on their site.

What information do third party sites receive?
Third party sites receive Google Account or OpenID username and the user's published information from the site.
It will not, however, receive information of friends or invited friends.

The third-party site may collect user information that is not related to the Google Friend Connect service – users are responsible for reading privacy policy of third party sites to see what information these sites collect.

Competition
Friend Connect sites (Google, Myspace and Facebook) emerged at similar times and therefore experienced competition throughout the development stages.
Google and Facebook announced their plans for Friend Connect sites within days of each other.
In May 2008 Facebook blocked its users from using Google Friend Connect. The block was a result of Facebook's concerns with Google's privacy policy as Facebook believed user information could be redistributed to others without the user's knowledge. Google responded by saying that "users are in control of their data at all times"
"Just hours after Yahoo announced a planned implementation of Facebook Connect on its network of sites, Google announced that Twitter credentials could be used to register on Google Friend Connect sites".
In 2009 Google Friend Connect altered its installation process. It no longer required the need for any file uploads. These changes came two days after Facebook Connect modified their installation process.

Features

Languages
When active, the website owner set the language of their site, and then allowed the user (via their Google Friend Connect account) to translate selected content into their own specified language.

Mapping
Users often have multiple user names and passwords if they register with more than one social networking site or third party site. Social Networking Connect Services, such as Google Friend Connect, were intended to remove the need for multiple registration by allowing links from a user's account on a social networking site to their account on a third party site.

Personalization
Personalization was intended to be achieved through gadgets. Gadgets such as 'Interests', allowed third-party sites to send out newsletters to those subscribed to the site and to customise newsletters based on user responses.

Google Friend Connect had an 'AdSense' feature that let Google advertise based on site content and the user interests that are publicly shared by the user.

See also 
 Facebook Connect
 Google profile
 Facebook Platform
 MySpace ID
 OpenID
 Twitter

References

Defunct social networking services
Discontinued Google services
Defunct American websites